Mahdiyeh Molaei Sarbijan (born 29 January 1991), known as Mahdiyeh Molaei, is an Iranian footballer who plays as a goalkeeper for Kowsar Women Football League club Bam Khatoon F.C. She has been a member of the senior Iran women's national team.

References

External links

1991 births
Living people
Iranian women's footballers
Iran women's international footballers
Women's association football goalkeepers
People from Kerman Province
21st-century Iranian women